Break bulk or breaking bulk may refer to:

 Breakbulk cargo, a shipping term for any loose material that must be loaded individually, and not in Intermodal containers nor in bulk as with oil or grain
 Breaking bulk (law), a legal term for taking anything out of a package or parcel or in any way destroying its entirety